The lists of Harper's Bazaar cover models gives the models for the covers of Harper's Bazaar magazine. The magazine has different editions in different countries, and the list is broken down by country.

Models by country

 List of Harper's Bazaar Arabia cover models
 List of Harper's Bazaar Argentina cover models
 List of Harper's Bazaar Australia cover models
 List of Harper's Bazaar Brazil cover models
 List of Harper's Bazaar Chile cover models
 List of Harper's Bazaar Germany cover models
 List of Harper's Bazaar India cover models
 List of Harper's Bazaar Indonesia cover models
 List of Harper's Bazaar Japan cover models
 List of Harper's Bazaar Netherlands cover models
 List of Harper's Bazaar Poland cover models
 List of Harper's Bazaar Russia cover models
 List of Harper's Bazaar Serbia cover models
 List of Harper's Bazaar Spain cover models
 List of Harper's Bazaar UK cover models
 List of Harper's Bazaar Ukraine cover models
 List of Harper's Bazaar US cover models